The 2011 Genesis was a professional wrestling pay-per-view (PPV) event
produced by Total Nonstop Action Wrestling (TNA), that took place on January 9, 2011, at the Impact Zone in Universal Studios Florida. It was the sixth event under the Genesis chronology and the first event of the 2011 TNA PPV schedule.

In October 2017, with the launch of the Global Wrestling Network, the event became available to stream on demand. It would later be available on Impact Plus in May 2019.

Storylines

Genesis featured nine professional wrestling matches that involved different wrestlers from pre-existing scripted feuds and storylines. Wrestlers portrayed villains, heroes, or less distinguishable characters in the scripted events that built tension and culminated in a wrestling match or series of matches.

Results

References

External links
Genesis website
TNA Official website

2011 in professional wrestling in Florida
2011 Total Nonstop Action Wrestling pay-per-view events
Events in Orlando, Florida
Impact Wrestling Genesis
January 2011 events in the United States
Professional wrestling in Orlando, Florida